Aisher is a surname. Notable people with the surname include:

Bruce Aisher, American music producer, journalist, and lecturer
Robin Aisher (born 1934), British sailor

See also
Asher (name)